Posht-e Aspar Barani (also Romanized as Posht-e Aspar Bārānī; also known as Posht-e Aspar) is a village in Ozgoleh Rural District, Ozgoleh District, Salas-e Babajani County, Kermanshah Province, Iran. At the 2006 census, its population was 15, in five families. In recant years it has gone up.

References 

Populated places in Salas-e Babajani County